The Mr. Christie's Book Awards was a Canadian literary prize awarded by Christie, Brown & Company, a division of Nabisco. The awards were discontinued in 2004. The awards were generally considered to be the "Giller Prize for children's authors".

History 
The awards were established to promote excellence in Canadian children's literature. The recipients were required to be Canadian citizens or permanent residents. The prize was first awarded in 1990. Initially, awards were given for text and illustrations in English and French language books, a total of four categories. In 1993, the categories for text were divided based on age: one for ages 8 or less and one for ages 9 to 14. In 1994, it was decided that text and illustrations would no longer be judged separately and the number of age categories was increased to three: age 7 and under, ages 8 to 11 and ages 12 to 16.

Winners

References

External links 

 

Canadian children's literary awards